Bayou Cane is a census-designated place (CDP) in Terrebonne Parish, Louisiana, United States. It is located just north of Houma and had a population of 19,770 in 2020.

Bayou Cane is the principal city of the Houma–Bayou Cane–Thibodaux metropolitan statistical area, which includes all of Terrebonne and Lafourche parishes.

Geography
Bayou Cane is located at  (29.626285, -90.748396).

Demographics

As of the 2020 United States census, there were 19,770 people, 7,500 households, and 4,761 families residing in the CDP.

Education
Bayou Cane is in the Terrebonne Parish School Board district.

References

External links
Bayou Cane's daily newspaper -- Houmatoday.com

Census-designated places in Louisiana
Census-designated places in Terrebonne Parish, Louisiana
Census-designated places in Houma – Thibodaux metropolitan area